Yaroslav Yarotsky (born 28 March 1996) is a Belarusian professional football player currently playing for Slutsk.

External links
 
 
 Profile at Dinamo Minsk website

1996 births
Living people
Belarusian footballers
Association football midfielders
FC Dinamo Minsk players
FC Neman Grodno players
FC Smolevichi players
FC Minsk players
FC Vitebsk players
FC Slutsk players